Gordon Reid defeated Gustavo Fernández in the final, 6–2, 6–2, to win the wheelchair singles tennis title at the 2021 Queen's Club Championships. Reid saved two match points in his semifinal match against Joachim Gérard en route to the title.

Alfie Hewett was the defending champion from when the tournament was last held in 2019, but he withdrew before the first round.

Seeds

Draw

Finals

References

External links
Singles Draw

Wheelchair Singles
Queen's Club Championships